Tornjoš (in Serbian Cyrillic: Торњош, in ) is a village in Serbia. It is situated in the Senta municipality, in the North Banat District, Vojvodina province. The village has a Hungarian ethnic majority (82.21%) with a present Romani minority (14.49%) and its population numbering 1,766 people (2002 census).

See also
List of places in Serbia
List of cities, towns and villages in Vojvodina

External links
History of Tornjoš

Places in Bačka
Senta